The Sicydiinae are a small subfamily (about 118 species) of freshwater gobies, with only nine genera. They are usually found in fast-moving mountain streams in tropical islands. They are characterized by highly developed rounded suction discs and an amphidromous lifecycle. Some species are popular in the aquarium trade. The genera included under Sicydiinae are:

Akihito Watson, Keith, and Marquet, 2007
Cotylopus Guichenot, 1863
Lentipes Günther, 1861
Parasicydium  Risch, 1980  
Sicyopterus Gill, 1860
Sicyopus Gill, 1863
Stiphodon Weber, 1895
Sicydium Cuvier & Valenciennes, 1837

References

External links

 
Oxudercidae
Taxa named by Theodore Gill
Ray-finned fish subfamilies